"Dead on Course" is the fourteenth episode of the second series of the 1960s cult British spy-fi television series The Avengers, starring Patrick Macnee. It was first broadcast by ABC on 29 December 1962. The episode was directed by Richmond Harding and written by Eric Paice.

Plot
Canadian aircraft crash off course, near an Irish convent.  But what happened to the crew?

Cast
 Patrick Macnee as John Steed
 Jon Rollason as Dr. Martin King 
 John McLaren as Freedman 
 Liam Gaffney as Michael Joyce
 Donal Donnelly as Vincent O'Brien 
 Peggy Marshall as Mother Superior
 Elisabeth Murray as Deidre O'Connor/Slade  
 Janet Hargreaves as Sister Isobel  
 Nigel Arkwright as Mr. Hughes
 Bruce Boa as Bob Austin Slade
 Margo Jenkins as Margot
 Trevor Reid as Pilot
 Edward Kelsey as Gerry
 Denis Cleary as Ambulance Man
 Wilfred Grove as Male Nun

References

External links

Episode overview on The Avengers Forever! website

The Avengers (season 2) episodes
1962 British television episodes